SS Pennsylvania may refer to any one of a number of ships.

 , a 3,104-ton ship of the American Line
 , a 12,891-ton ship of the Hamburg-America Line built by Harland and Wolff
 SS Pennsylvania (1929), a 20,526-ton ship built for the Panama Pacific Line; later renamed Argentina.

See also

Ship names